Canton is a town, incorporated in 1806, located in the Farmington Valley section of Hartford County, Connecticut, United States. The population was 10,124 as of the 2020 census. It is bordered by Granby on the north, Simsbury on the east, Avon and Burlington on the south, New Hartford on the west, and Barkhamsted on the northwest. Running through it is the Farmington River. The town includes the villages of North Canton, Canton Center, Canton (Canton Valley), and Collinsville. In September 2007, Collinsville was ranked in Budget Travel magazine as one of the "Ten Coolest Small Towns In America".

History
The name of Canton was officially designated on its incorporation in 1806. While assisting with the town's organization, its name was given by Ephraim Mills, ancestor of Lewis S. Mills. There are two competing theories for Mills' source of the name, however.

According to William Edgar Simonds, husband of Ephraim Mills' great-granddaughter, and Sylvester Barbour in his book Reminisces, Canton's name derives from canton, a Swiss administrative division. Simonds wrote that Canton "... is derived from a supposed likeness to a Swiss canton, the meaning of the word being to divide or set off, and the partition from Simsbury made the name appropriate." Barbour instead noted that "it came from Mr. Mills' interest in the Swiss people and their ardent patriotism, and was suggested to his mind by their territorial divisions into cantons. The name appealed to him, partly because of its pleasant sound, and its being so easy to read and write."

In an article within a 1903 issue of The Connecticut Magazine, Joel N. Eno claimed without a source that Canton's name derived from Canton, an archaic name for Guangzhou, China. This claim has since been repeated by others, such as The Register Citizen, a Connecticut newspaper.

Other towns such as Canton, Massachusetts and Canton, Ohio have used the name for the town.

It separated from Simsbury in 1806. At the Collins ax factory in Collinsville, Elisha Root invented the important industrial technique of die casting.

Points of interest
The Canton Historical Museum in Collinsville is located in a building of the former Collins Axe Company, founded by Samuel W. Collins and one of the first ax factories in the world. It displays a 19th-century general store, a post office, a printing press and blacksmith and barber shops. Vehicles, tools and farm implements are also exhibited, as well as a working railroad diorama, Victorian fashions, toys and dolls.

The town is on the Farmington River, and Collinsville Canoe & Kayak is the largest specialty canoe and kayak store in New England. A rail trail also runs through the town.

In the southeastern corridor of Canton, along U.S. Route 44, there is an open-air shopping center called The Shops at Farmington Valley which opened in 2004. The shopping center has 50 stores and restaurants, including Barnes & Noble, Dick's Sporting Goods, Kohl's, ShopRite, Old Navy, Talbots, and Panera Bread.

The Collinsville Renewable Energy Promotion Act (H.R. 316;113th Congress) was a piece of federal legislation that dealt specifically with Collinsville, CT.  The bill was introduced into the United States House of Representatives of the 113th United States Congress by Representatives Elizabeth Esty.  The bill directed the Federal Energy Regulatory Commission to reinstate two lapsed licenses and grant them to the town so that the town could restart two old dams and generate hydroelectric power.

Geography

Demographics

As of the census of 2010, there were 10,129 people, 4,086 households, and 2,785 families residing in the town. The racial makeup of the town was 95.7% White, 0.9% African American, 0.3% Native American, 1.5% Asian, 0.0% Pacific Islander, 0.4% from other races, and 1.2% from two or more races. Hispanic or Latino of any race were 2.6% of the population. The population density according to the 2000 census, was 359.7 people per square mile (138.9/km2).

There were 4,086 households, out of which 57.8% had children under the age of 18 living with them, 57.5% were married couples living together, 7.68% had a female householder with no husband present, 2.94% had a male householder with no wife present, and 31.84% were non-families.  10.5% had someone living alone who was 65 years of age or older.  The average household size was 2.46 and the average family size was 3.01.

In the town, the population was spread out, with 25.7% under the age of 20, 3.7% from 20 to 24, 22.7% from 25 to 44, 32.8% from 45 to 64, and 15.1% who were 65 years of age or older.  The median age was 43.9 years. Females made up 51.7% of the population.

, the median income for a household in the town was $91,651, and the median income for a family was $131,673. Males had a median income of $49,980 versus $37,652 for females. The per capita income for the town was $53,007.  About 1.9% of families and 2.7% of the population were below the poverty line, including 3.2% of those under age 18 and 0.5% of those age 65 or over. The median income for a household (est. in 2009) has rose in the town of Canton due to an increase of home sales in the past decade. Canton was listed as one of the fastest-growing towns in Connecticut and is steadily growing.

Government and politics

Transportation
The town is served by U.S. Routes 44 and 202, as well as Connecticut Routes 177, 179, and 309. Commuter bus service to Hartford is provided by Connecticut Transit Hartford; a Park & Ride lot is on Old River Road in Collinsville.

Notable people

 Lucien Barbour (1811–1880), congressman for Indiana
 Philemon Bliss (1813–1889), congressman for Ohio
 Samuel W. Collins (1802–1871), founder of the Collins Axe Factory for which Collinsville is named
 Danny Hoffman (1880–1922), Major League Baseball player
 Uriel Holmes (1764–1827), congressman for Connecticut 
 Merrill I. Mills (1819–1882), mayor of Detroit, Michigan
 Anson Greene Phelps (1781–1853), industrialist and philanthropist
 William E. Simonds (1842–1903), US Civil War veteran, Medal of Honor recipient and congressman for Connecticut
 David Vaudreuil (born 1966), Major League Soccer player and coach

References

External links

Town of Canton official website

 
Towns in Hartford County, Connecticut
Towns in Connecticut
Greater Hartford